Psychological Services is a peer-reviewed academic journal published by the American Psychological Association on behalf of APA Division 18. The current editor-in-chief is Patrick DeLeon.  The journal was established in 2004 and covers "the broad range of psychological services delivered in organized care settings". These settings include, but are not limited to: 
 jails
 courts
 Indian Health Service
 the military
 Department of Veterans Affairs
 university clinics
 training hospitals

Abstracting and indexing 
The journal is abstracted and indexed by MEDLINE/PubMed and the Social Sciences Citation Index. According to the Journal Citation Reports, the journal has a 2020 impact factor of 2.659.

References

External links 
 

American Psychological Association academic journals
English-language journals
Quarterly journals
Publications established in 2004
Psychology journals